was a village located in Yame District, Fukuoka Prefecture, Japan.

Yabe is located at 330m above sea level. The average temperature is 14 °C and the average annual precipitation is 2,706mm.

As of 2006, the village had an estimated population of 1,730 and a density of 21.50 persons per km2. The total area was 80.46 km2.

On 1 February 2010, Yabe, along with the towns of Kurogi and Tachibana, and the village of Hoshino (all from Yame District), was merged into the expanded city of Yame.

References
  

Dissolved municipalities of Fukuoka Prefecture
Populated places disestablished in 2010